Jackie Chan Adventures is a video game based upon the animated series of the same name.

The Game Boy Advance game, entitled Jackie Chan Adventures: Legend of the Dark Hand, was developed by Torus Games, published by Activision, and released in 2001. The PlayStation 2 version was developed by Atomic Planet Entertainment, published by Sony Computer Entertainment, and released on October 1, 2004, in Europe. The latter console version is compatible with the EyeToy. Jackie, Jade, Uncle, Valmont and Shendu were voiced by their original actors.

On May 11, 2005, Hip Games (a subsidiary of Hip Interactive) announced it would be publishing the PS2 version for North America, and the game was featured at E3 2005 as a part of their lineup. However, in July of that same year, Hip Interactive went bankrupt, and no one else picked up the PS2 title for a North American release.

Story 
The story is a mix of Seasons 1 and 2 of Jackie Chan Adventures and follows The Demon Sorcerers, led by the evil Shendu, the demon of fire. The eight demons were banished to the Demon Netherworld by eight Chinese immortals using the magic of the Pan Ku Box. In present times, the Dark Hand, led by Valmont, are using the Pan Ku Box to unleash the demons upon the world. However, Jackie Chan, his niece Jade Chan, and their Uncle are willing to stop the demons from returning to the planet. The heroes, also known as the J-Team, search for the magical 12 Talismans as well.

Characters 
Jackie Chan: The main protagonist of the game. Jackie is an archeologist who secretly works for Section 13. He has a niece named Jade and an uncle named Uncle. In his mission, he must collect the Talismans and defeat the Demon Sorcerers as well. He is an expert in martial arts.

Jade Chan: Jackie's 12-year-old niece from China. She moved to the United States and has enjoyed her adventures with her uncle, who believes the missions he goes on are too dangerous for Jade.

Uncle: Jackie's uncle who owns an antique shop. He is a Chi Wizard and studied with Chi Master Fong for 15 years. He knows a lot about antiques and magical things, and does research to find out what magic forces Jackie may deal with in his adventures. He has a habit for hitting Jackie over the head.

Tohru: A very large Japanese man. He used to work for the Dark Hand and Valmont gave him the Dragon Talisman to power up his strength. He later joined the J-Team.

Captain Black: An old friend of Jackie's and the leader of Section 13. He sends Jackie off on his missions, but he dislikes magic and demons.

El Toro Fuerte: A famous masked wrestler from Mexico. He was using the Ox Talisman to power up his strength but gave it to Jackie, after he defeated him in battle. El Toro's biggest fan is Paco.

Paco: El Toro's biggest fan. He believes Jackie is a "mouseman" and El Toro is the greatest. He and Jade seem to argue about this every time they meet.

Viper: An ex-thief who is good with martial arts. She once used the Snake Talisman to steal jewels, but Jackie managed to get it from her and she now is a member of the J-Team.

The Fishing Guy: This Chinese man appears practically in every level. He enjoys fishing and will save the game for Jackie in his diary. He has his own fishing store, and allows the player access to the fishing game. His fishing stores are in the Japanese Gardens, Fisherman's Wharf, the Spanish Village and Golden Gate Park.

The Dark Hand: An organisation of criminals, led by the British Valmont, who is possessed by Shendu. Valmont is intelligent and dislikes sharing his body with Shendu. Hak Foo is a muscular henchman of the Dark Hand, has named all of his attacks and is Tohru's replacement. Finn is a real joker and dresses in clothes from the 70's. Ratso is strong, but a bit stupid and his favourite music group is Kiss. Chow is the shortest member of the Dark Hand but the best at using martial arts. He wears prescription sunglasses, black clothes and likes drinking coffee.

The Demon Sorcerers: The eight demons that once ruled the world. They are led by Shendu. They each have their own powers derived from fire, sky, moon, earth, thunder, mountain, wind and water. They were defeated and banished to the Netherworld by the eight immortals of China, using the Pan Ku Box. Shendu wishes to use the puzzle box to release his brothers and sisters, so he and they can rule the world again.

Shadowkhan: These shadow warriors are Shendu's minions. The normal Shadowkhan are weak and don't take much time to be defeated. The Armoured Shadowkhan dress in red and attack with lethal blades. The Shadowkhan Mages wear Chinese hats and shoot fireballs at Jackie. The Samurai Shadowkhan are the most powerful of the Shadowkhan. They are spirits in samurai armour and attack with sharp swords. They do tend to lose their helmets occasionally.

Reception 

The game received "generally favorable reviews" on both platforms according to the review aggregation website Metacritic.

References

External links 
 
 

2001 video games
PlayStation 2 games
PlayStation 2-only games
Game Boy Advance games
Game Boy Advance-only games
Windows games
Windows-only games
Cancelled Xbox games
Cancelled GameCube games
Action-adventure games
Video games based on television series
Video games developed in Australia
Video games developed in the United Kingdom
Jackie Chan video games
Video games about demons
Video games set in San Francisco
Video games set in Mexico
Video games set in Japan
Video games set in China
Video games set in Hong Kong
Video games set in Russia
Video games with cel-shaded animation
Single-player video games
Activision games
Sony Interactive Entertainment games
Sony Pictures video games
Atomic Planet Entertainment games
Torus Games games